Mark "Frosty" Winterbottom (born 20 May 1981) is an Australian professional racing driver. He currently competes in the Repco Supercars Championship, driving the No. 18 Chevrolet Camaro ZL1 for Team 18. His career highlights include winning the 2013 Supercheap Auto Bathurst 1000 (with Steven Richards), twice winning the Sandown 500 (2006 and 2015) and receiving the Mike Kable Young Gun Award in 2003. Winterbottom has also won his maiden championship title in the 2015 International V8 Supercars Championship, making it the first title for Ford in five years. He also voices himself in the Australian version of the hit 2011 film, Cars 2.

Early career

Beginnings 
Winterbottom made his motorsport debut racing motorbikes, racing in club level 50 cc events, progressing to the 80 cc class and competing in fields that included riders Anthony Gobert and Chad Reed. Winterbottom raced whenever he could between his soccer commitments. Raced a dirt Mini-Speedcar and won the NSW and ACT State Championships.

Karting 
Winterbottom competed in his first kart race in the Cadet class at Wollongong (NSW) and would continue racing karts successfully to the age of 21. Winterbottom won ten Australian Kart Championships and 25 state Kart Championships during his rise through Australia's karting ranks. Winterbottom's national titles were six Clubman Light titles, three Junior National Lights titles and one Junior Clubman title.

In 1998, Winterbottom visited America on a family holiday and heard about a major karting event taking place close by – so a last-minute decision was made to rent a kart locally and compete. Winterbottom then won the Knoxville State Championship title race. In 1999 he competed in Japan at the Suzuka Champions Kart race on invitation.

In 2001 Winterbottom was crowned as Australian Formula A Kart Champion (Rotax 125cc Class).

Formula Ford 

In 2001, Winterbottom made his Formula Ford debut in the Victorian Formula Ford Championship. Winterbottom raced to runner-up honours after winning four races out of six rounds, missing one round due to karting commitments. He won the Ford Kart Stars Scholarship Championship, gaining a Ford-supported drive in the 2002 Australian Formula Ford Championship.

He finished second in the 2002 Australian Formula Ford Championship with two round victories, five race wins and two pole positions. The championship was won by Winterbottom's future V8 Supercars rival Jamie Whincup. He was presented with 2002 Avon Formula Ford Rookie of the Year Award.

Touring car career

Development Series
In 2003, Winterbottom became the Konica V8 Supercar Series champion in his debut season. Winterbottom raced with Ford team Stone Brothers Racing (SBR) to five round victories and six pole positions in an almost perfect season. Two of Winterbottom's race victories were gained from rear-of-field reverse grid starts. He missed out on making a clean sweep of the series due to an engine failure in the fifth round at Phillip Island.

He also debuted in the V8 Supercars Championship at the Sandown 500 and Bathurst 1000 with SBR, sharing a BA Falcon with Mark Noske. Winterbottom and Noske finished 11th at Sandown, before qualifying 16th at the 2003 Bathurst 1000 and then retiring at three-quarter distance whilst running in third with engine problems.

He was the recipient of the Mike Kable Young Gun Award.

Larkham Motor Sport
Winterbottom joined Ford V8 Supercar team Larkham Motor Sport (LMS) and competed in the 2004 and 2005 V8 Supercar championships. Highlights of his debut season included a fifth-place finish at Bathurst and sixth-place result at Sandown in 2004. Winterbottom's best qualifying result was fifth at the Darwin round in 2005. The lowlight was at the V8 Supercars China Round in which Winterbottom avoided injury after a loose drain cover penetrated the chassis floor and damaged the driver's seat.

Ford Performance Racing

2006 

Winterbottom joined Ford Performance Racing (FPR) as driver of the number 5 Ford Credit Falcon for the 2006 and 2007 V8 Supercar championship seasons. This appointment continued Winterbottom's career-long involvement with Ford Australia from the karting ranks all the way to a lead role with Ford's major V8 Supercars team.
 
He claimed his first V8 Supercars round victory co-driving with Jason Bright at the 2006 Betta Electrical 500 and gained second place overall round finishes at Pukekohe and Surfers Paradise. By the midpoint of the season, Winterbottom had climbed from 22nd to third in the championship standings and added two further podium finishes with a third at Symmons Plains Raceway and second at Phillip Island. Phillip Island also saw Winterbottom achieve his first V8 Supercars sprint race victory. With nine top ten finishes for the season, Winterbottom had secured third place in the Drivers' Championship in just his third season of main V8 Supercar Series competition.

2007 
Winterbottom achieved 5th in the championship, with the highlight being winning his first solo V8 Supercars round at the Desert 400 in Bahrain, preserving FPR's undefeated record at the international round. Winterbottom also gained four pole positions, including his first at Pukekohe Park, which was followed by poles at the Sandown 500, Bathurst 1000 and at the Desert 400. These four poles allowed him to claim the 2007 V8 Supercars Pole Award. Winterbottom went off late in the race whilst leading the 2007 Bathurst 1000. FPR secured Winterbottom as the driver of the number 5 FPR Falcon for a further three years.

2008 

Winterbottom's highlight of 2008 was a dominant round victory at the BigPond 400 at Wanneroo's Barbagallo Raceway in Perth, Western Australia. Winterbottom achieved pole position and wins in all three races. Winterbottom also won the 2008 City of Ipswich 400 at Queensland Raceway. With further good results at Adelaide, Eastern Creek, Surfers Paradise and Symmons Plains, he placed second in the championship, just behind his former Formula Ford rival Whincup.

2009 

Winterbottom experienced a challenging season, finishing in fifth position in the championship, eight places ahead of team-mate Steven Richards. His highlights included an event win at the Gold Coast 600 and pole positions for Race 3 of the championship at the Hamilton 400 in New Zealand, and race 5 at Winton Motor Raceway. On both occasions, he had troublesome races which resulted in little or no points for the championship. In race 6 at Winton, Winterbottom recovered from the difficulties of race 5 to finish in second position. He also won a race at the V8 Supercars Challenge non-championship round at the Australian Grand Prix.

2010 
In 2010, Winterbottom was a distant yet mathematical chance of winning the championship title heading into the final round, the Sydney 500. However a crash, which ironically also involved fellow contenders Whincup and James Courtney, in wet conditions in the Saturday race ruled Winterbottom out of the title race.

2011 

In 2011, Winterbottom finished a distant third to the Triple Eight Race Engineering cars. He scored two wins, at the Gold Coast 600 with international co-driver Richard Lyons and in the final race of the year at the Sydney 500.

2012 

Winterbottom finished the season in third position, with three race wins in the middle of the season. Before the final round of the championship, the Sydney 500 on the Homebush Street Circuit, Winterbottom was in second, but fell behind Craig Lowndes to finish third. Winterbottom also claimed the coveted Barry Sheene Medal for the best and fairest driver in the series.

2013 

In 2013, Winterbottom won the Bathurst 1000 alongside ex-teammate Steven Richards on 13 October. However, due to a poor start to the championship, Winterbottom was only able to finish fourth in the championship, with three race wins. Teammate Will Davison finished narrowly ahead in third, aiding FPR's rise in the Teams' Championship to finish second for the first time.

2014 

In 2014 Winterbottom started the season very well, leading the championship by 161 points after the 2014 Skycity Triple Crown in June. Despite high hopes of claiming his first title, Winterbottom's campaign ultimately crumbled against the Triple Eight juggernaut. He did not win another race after the Darwin round. At the 2014 Supercheap Auto Bathurst 1000, Winterbottom was a chance of going back-to-back late in the race, until an incident with an attacking Craig Lowndes resulted in him dropping back, and eventually recovering to take a fifth-place finish. As in 2012, going into the final round in Sydney, Winterbottom was second with Whincup in first and out of reach. However, Shane van Gisbergen won the Sunday race to demote Winterbottom to third in the standings.

Prodrive Racing Australia

2015 

In 2015, Prodrive Racing Australia (the new name for Ford Performance Racing, due to reduced support from Ford) debuted the Ford FG X Falcon, and it brought considerable success almost immediately, with Winterbottom taking four wins out of four races at the non-championship V8 Supercars Challenge event at the Australian Grand Prix. Winterbottom then achieved eight race wins in the middle part of the championship year, including a clean-sweep of the 2015 Castrol Edge Townsville 400. This resulted in Winterbottom taking a large championship lead into the endurance races. Driving with Steve Owen, Winterbottom then went on to increase his lead with his ninth win of the year at the 2015 Wilson Security Sandown 500, before finishing second at the 2015 Supercheap Auto Bathurst 1000. Despite not winning a race after Sandown, Winterbottom held on to secure his first championship title in a showdown against Craig Lowndes at the final round, the Sydney 500.

2016 
Winterbottom had a slow start to his championship defence, not achieving a podium finish until the fifth race of the season at Symmons Plains. Winterbottom's first victory of the year was at the Perth SuperSprint, where on older tyres he held off Scott McLaughlin by under half a second. Two podiums at Winton gave Winterbottom the championship lead, before a poor event in Darwin dropped him back in the standings. Solid results at Townsville and Queensland Raceway followed, leaving Winterbottom third in the championship standings before the winter break. However, a decline in pace in the second half of the season left Winterbottom to finish sixth in the championship, with only one further race victory, at the Auckland SuperSprint.

2017 

2017 saw Winterbottom complete a winless year for the first time since moving to Ford Performance Racing in 2006. Highlights included podiums at the Phillip Island 500, Townsville 400 and Auckland SuperSprint, while the lowlight was crashing out of the Bathurst 1000 on the penultimate lap while battling for fifth place. Winterbottom secured sixth in the championship for the second consecutive year, albeit only after Craig Lowndes' late retirement at the season-ending Newcastle 500.

Tickford Racing

2018 

In 2018, Prodrive Racing Australia was again renamed, to Tickford Racing, and Winterbottom began the year with a top five Saturday result at the Adelaide 500 before a pit lane penalty dropped him down the field in the Sunday race. His fortunes did not improve, with Tickford Racing enduring a difficult start to the season until Winterbottom scored both his and Tickford Racing's first race podium of the year at the fifth event at Barbagallo. It was confirmed on 1 November that Winterbottom would leave Tickford Racing at the end of the 2018 season, after 13 years with the team. Despite a difficult final season with the team, in which he finished only 12th in the championship, Winterbottom left the team with a record of 412 race starts, 38 wins, 35 poles and 117 podiums.

Team 18
Winterbottom announced ahead of the 2018 Newcastle 500 that he would be moving to Team 18 in 2019, the first time he will have driven a Holden in his career.

Stock Car Brasil
In 2014 and 2015, Winterbottom appeared in the season-opening two-driver round of the Stock Car Brasil championship, for Voxx Racing. In 2014, he drove alongside Sérgio Jimenez to fourth at the Autódromo José Carlos Pace whilst in 2015 he finished second with Marcos Gomes at the Autódromo Internacional Ayrton Senna. Just like Winterbottom, Gomes went on to win his respective championship title in 2015. Winterbottom returned to Brazil in 2018, finishing eleventh at the Autódromo José Carlos Pace driving with Átila Abreu, despite starting from the rear of the grid.

Personal life
Winterbottom is the son of the 1969 and 1974 Australian Sprintcar Champion and former chairman of the Sprintcar Control Council of Australia, Jim Winterbottom. Educated at Doonside Technology High School, Winterbottom took up the sport of Soccer from the age of six, and by eleven was competing with a state level team, (Blacktown United) in matches across New South Wales. He made the decision to give up soccer to pursue his motor racing ambitions at the age of eleven.

Winterbottom was used as the voice of the character 'Frosty' in the Australian Release of the 2011 Pixar film Cars 2. He also appeared as a contestant on Season 3 of the Seven Network's celebrity series Australia's Greatest Athlete in 2011.

Career results

Supercars Championship results

Complete Bathurst 1000 results

Complete Bathurst 12 Hour results

Complete Stock Car Brasil results

References

External links

Personal website
Ford Performance Racing website
Driver Database profile
Racing Reference profile

1981 births
Formula Ford drivers
Living people
Racing drivers from Sydney
Sportsmen from New South Wales
Supercars Championship drivers
Bathurst 1000 winners
Stock Car Brasil drivers
BMW M drivers
Stone Brothers Racing drivers